The Panini Keypad is a typing technology which has been developed by Luna Ergonomics, a subsidiary of Noida. It is an application that offers single key press input in Indian language on mobile. So far, it supports Hindi, Bengali, Assamese, Telugu, Marathi, Tamil, Gujarati, Kannada, Malayalam and Punjabi.

The technology is based on CleverTexting; patented predictive texting software which creates an ergonomic dynamic virtual keypad using statistical predictions based on corpora linguistics.  The software uses a form of compression to increase the number of characters in each text message to 210. The Panini keyboard can also be used on laptops, tablets and desktop computers.

References

External links
Official website

Keyboard layout software